Santa Ana is a corregimiento in Los Santos District, Los Santos Province, Panama with a population of 3,329 as of 2010. Its population as of 1990 was 2,652; its population as of 2000 was 2,970.

References

Corregimientos of Los Santos Province